Jorge Alberto Drovandi (born 5 November 1985 in Rosario) is an Argentine footballer who plays for Sportivo Barracas as a left sided striker. His nickname in Spanish is "El Mono" which means "The Monkey".

Club career
Drovandi began his professional football career in the Argentine Primera División with San Lorenzo de Almagro before dropping into the lower leagues with Chacarita Juniors, Aldosivi and Asociación Atlético Luján de Cuyo.

Drovandi arrived in Newcastle on 2 August 2007 and was given the number 7 jersey. He made his A-League debut when he came on as a substitute against Perth Glory in Round 1.

Before the end of 2007 he didn't renew his contract Newcastle Jets, and went to play in the Ecuadorian league where he did really well scoring several opportunities in Deportivo Azogues. His contract expired and left for Costa Rica where he played in Club Sport Herediano, one of the three most important teams in the Central American country, in the last semester of 2009, there he scored a few goals in a team that did not give him much opportunity and is going through financial difficulties.

He signed for Salvadoran club Alianza ahead of the 2015 Clausura season.

References

External links
 En Una Baldosa Profile

1985 births
Living people
Footballers from Rosario, Santa Fe
Argentine footballers
Aldosivi footballers
Chacarita Juniors footballers
San Lorenzo de Almagro footballers
Argentine Primera División players
A-League Men players
Newcastle Jets FC players
C.S. Herediano footballers
Alianza F.C. footballers
Argentine expatriate footballers
Expatriate soccer players in Australia
Expatriate footballers in Costa Rica
Expatriate footballers in El Salvador
Association football forwards